

The 21 cm Mörser 10 (21 cm Mrs 10) was a heavy howitzer used by Germany in World War I (although classified as a mortar (Mörser) by the German military). It replaced the obsolete 21 cm Mörser 99, which lacked a recoil system. For transport, it broke down into two loads. Some howitzers were fitted with a Gun shield during the war. As it was also intended for siege use, a concrete-penetrating shell was also used. Unusually, it had two spades: a folding one halfway down the trail and a fixed one at the end of the trail.

Before the 21 cm Mörser 10 was commissioned for mass production, a small test series of 21 cm Versuchmörser 06 ("test mortar") was given to the German army. Eight pieces equipped two batteries, but their range of only 7 km was found insufficient, so the range was increased for the production version. Serial number 3 of these rare pieces is now exposed at Red Cliffs, Victoria.

216 were in service at the beginning of the war. It was replaced by the 21 cm Mörser 16, which was also known as the langer 21 cm Mörser since it was merely a lighter 21 cm Mrs 10 with a longer barrel for extra range and other refinements.

The specifications provided for this weapon by difference sources are contradictory and, thus,  those given here cannot be regarded as authoritative.

Gallery

See also
 Isis District War Memorial in Childers, Queensland, Australia, where a surviving 21 cm Mörser 10 engraved with "Nr 406 - Fried Krupp AG, Essen - 1916" is now located, having been captured by the Australian Army in Flanders.

Weapons of comparable role, performance and era

 BL 8 inch Howitzer Mk I – V British equivalent firing slightly lighter shell

References 
 Hogg, Ian. Twentieth-Century Artillery. New York: Barnes & Noble Books, 2000 
 Jäger, Herbert. German Artillery of World War One. Ramsbury, Marlborough, Wiltshire: Crowood Press, 2001

Notes

Further reading
  Guy François, "Le Mörser de calibre 21 cm", Tank Zone, issue 11/2010, June–July, pp. 46–53, Hachette Histoire et Collections

External links

 Video clips on YouTube
 List and pictures of WW1 surviving 21cm morsers 10
 Obús Krupp 210 mm 10/16 La Gran Guerra 1914-1918
 The Spandau Citadel Museum has an exemplar in travel position

World War I howitzers
World War I artillery of Germany
210 mm artillery